A by-election was held for the New South Wales Legislative Assembly electorate of Gundagai on 23 November 1882 because of the death of William Forster. Parliament was dissolved on the same day as the polling and so Bruce Smith could not take his seat.

Dates

Result

William Forster died.

See also
Electoral results for the district of Gundagai
List of New South Wales state by-elections

References

1882 elections in Australia
New South Wales state by-elections
1880s in New South Wales